Octomeria linearifolia is a species of orchid endemic to Brazil (Pernambuco to Paraná).

References

External links 

linearifolia
Endemic orchids of Brazil
Orchids of Paraná (state)
Orchids of Pernambuco